Charles Arthur Reed (1857 – December 17, 1940) was a New Jersey politician who served in the New Jersey General Assembly from 1895 to 1896, and then in the New Jersey Senate from 1896 to 1900, serving as president of the Senate from 1899 to 1900.

Born in Fort Wayne, Indiana Charles was the oldest son of Col. Hugh B. Reed, of the 44th Indiana during the Civil War. He received an undergraduate degree from Rutgers University in 1878 and a law degree from Columbia Law School in 1883. He then worked for the Bureau of Pensions in Washington, D.C., for a time, eventually returning to New Jersey and becoming involved in politics.

Death
Reed died at the Park Hotel in Brooklyn at the age of 83.

References

1857 births
1940 deaths
People from Fort Wayne, Indiana
Rutgers University alumni
Columbia Law School alumni
Politicians from Somerset County, New Jersey
Republican Party members of the New Jersey General Assembly
Republican Party New Jersey state senators
Presidents of the New Jersey Senate
Indiana lawyers
New Jersey lawyers